Chezhan Subdistrict is a subdistrict of Xinhua District, Cangzhou, Hebei, People's Republic of China. , it has 2 residential communities under its administration.

See also
List of township-level divisions of Hebei

References

Township-level divisions of Hebei